Dongo is a Kresh language of South Sudan, distinct enough to not be a dialect of Kresh.

The name Dongo is also used by several Ubangian languages.

References

 Nilo-Saharan list (Blench 2000)

Central Sudanic languages
Kresh languages